In the Tenrikyo religion, the Jiba (ぢば) is the axis mundi where adherents believe that God created humankind. The spot is located in the center of the main sanctuary at Tenrikyo Church Headquarters, located in Tenri, Nara, Japan. It is marked by a wooden pillar called the Kanrodai (かんろだい).

Significance
The significance of Jiba is described in all three Tenrikyo scriptures – the Ofudesaki, the Mikagura-uta, and the Osashizu. Phrases in the scriptures define Jiba as simply "the origin," and more specifically "the origin where God began human beings," "the origin of this world," and "the origin of all things." In the context of Tenrikyo's creation narrative, the Jiba is said to be the spot where Izanagi-no-Mikoto and Izanami-no-Mikoto, the models of husband and wife, conceived the first children. The scriptures also assert that Jiba is the place where God the Parent and the everliving Oyasama reside.

The Jiba is closely associated with Tenrikyo's understanding of salvation. The core ritual of Tenrikyo's liturgy, the Kagura Service, is performed around Jiba. The Osashizu and stories from Anecdotes of Oyasama refer to Jiba as the place where one can request one's own salvation or the salvation of others, and accordingly an important religious practice for adherents is to make pilgrimages there.

Kanrodai

The Kanrodai (かんろだい) is a hexagonal stand that marks the Jiba. Adherents believe that when the hearts of human beings have been adequately purified through the Service, a sweet dew would fall from the heavens onto a vessel placed on top of the stand.

References

Citations

Bibliography

Further reading
 
 
中山正善 Nakayama, Shōzen. 『続　ひとことはなし　その二』Zoku Hitokotohanashi sono ni.

Tenrikyo